Faridganj is an upazila of Chandpur District in the Division of Chittagong Division, Bangladesh. It is located between 23°03' and 23°14' north latitudes and in between 90°41' and 90°53' east longitudes.

Geography
It has 62,331 households and a total area of 231.56 km2.

Demographics
According to the 2011 Bangladesh census, Faridganj had a population of 396,683. Male 182,360 and female 214,323.  Males constituted 49.69% of the population, and females 50.31%. The population aged 18 or over was 160,438. Faridganj had an average literacy rate of 58.1%, male 56.6% and Female 59.3% (7+ years), compared to the national average of 71.4% (2015).

Administration
Faridganj Upazila is divided into Faridganj Municipality and 15 union parishads: Dakshin Faridganj, Dakshin Gobindapur, Dakshin Paik Para, Dakshin Rupsha, Paschim Balithuba, Paschim Char Dukhia, Paschim Gupti, Paschim Subidpur, Purba Balithuba, Purba Char Dukhia, Purba Gupti, Purba Subidpur, Uttar Gobindapur, Uttar Paikpara, and Uttar Rupsha. The union parishads are subdivided into 159 mauzas and 161 villages.

Faridganj Municipality is subdivided into 9 wards and 21 mahallas.

Education

There are four colleges in the upazila. They include Faridganj Bangabandhu Degree College, founded in 1970, Gallak Adarsha College (1994), and Gridakalindia Hazera Hasmath Degre College (1995).

According to Banglapedia, Baragaon High School, founded in 1899, Basara High School (1926), Chandra Imam Ali High School and College (1918), Grehakalindia High School (1926), Kaonia Shaheed Habibullah High School (1926), Paikpara U.G High School (1913), and Rupsa Ahmadia High School (1913) are notable secondary schools.

Notable people
Abidur Reza Chowdhury (1872–1961), politician and educationist

See also
Upazilas of Bangladesh
Districts of Bangladesh
Divisions of Bangladesh

References

Upazilas of Chandpur District